Cora totonacorum is a species of basidiolichen in the family Hygrophoraceae. Found in Mexico, it was formally described as a new species in 2019 by Bibiana Moncada, Rosa Emilia Pérez-Pérez, and Robert Lücking. The lichen is only known to occur at the type locality, where it grows as an epiphyte on branches of Baccharis. Cora totonacorum grows in close association with mosses, liverworts, and other lichens. It is sympatric with Cora lawreyana. The specific epithet totonacorum  refers to the Totonac people, who live in the states of Veracruz, Puebla, and Hidalgo, and who were important vanilla producers historically.

References

totonacorum
Lichen species
Lichens described in 2019
Lichens of Mexico
Taxa named by Robert Lücking
Basidiolichens